Arnarson is a surname. Notable people with the surname include: 

Ingólfr Arnarson, first permanent Nordic settler of Iceland
Örn Arnarson (born 1981), Icelandic swimmer 
Ottó P. Arnarson, member of Týr (band), a folk metal band from the Faroe Islands

See also
Arnara
Arnoro